Campaea perlata, the pale beauty, is a species of moth in the family Geometridae. The average wingspan is about 28–51 mm, and the female tends to be much larger than the male.

Range
C. perlata is seen in almost the entire North American continent.

Food plants of the larvae
 Alder
 Ash
 Basswood
 Beech
 Birch
 Blueberry
 Canada buffaloberry
 Cherry
 Fir
 Elm
 Hemlock
 Maple
 Oak
 Photinia
 Pine
 Poplar
 Rose
 Spruce
 Tamarack
 Willow

References

External links
BugGuide Info Page
ITIS
EoL

Campaeini
Moths of North America
Moths described in 1858
Taxa named by Achille Guenée